Agostino Pinelli Luciani (Genoa, 1537Genoa, 1620) was the 88th doge of the Republic of Genoa.

Biography 
Belonging to the so-called "old" nobility, and at the age of 72 he was elected to the dogal position with the elections of 1 April 1609, the forty-third in biennial succession and the eighty-eighth in republican history. His dogate, initially uncertain, was of ordinary administration and tranquility. He ended his term on 2 April 1611.

See also 
 Republic of Genoa
 Doge of Genoa

References 

17th-century Doges of Genoa
1537 births
1620 deaths